Staryye Tukmakly (İśke Tuqmaqlı) is a rural locality (a selo) and the administrative centre of Starotukmaklinsky Selsoviet, Kushnarenkovsky District, Bashkortostan, Russia. The population was 728 as of 2010. There are 7 streets.

Geography 
Staryye Tukmakly is located 22 km southwest of Kushnarenkovo (the district's administrative centre) by road. Uguzevo is the nearest rural locality.

References 

Rural localities in Kushnarenkovsky District